Interbabe Concern is The Loud Family's third full-length album, and their first to be produced by Scott Miller instead of Mitch Easter.  With the exception of keyboard player Paul Wieneke and Miller, this was a new line-up of the band.

Personnel
After touring in support of the 1994 album The Tape of Only Linda, three members – bass player Rob Poor, guitarist Zachary Smith, and drummer Jozef Becker – left the group for family or career reasons.

For Interbabe Concern, Scott Miller took over the lead guitar duties that he had ceded to Smith on prior Loud Family albums. Paul Wieneke remained on keyboards and occasional lead vocals, and Kenny Kessel and Dawn Richardson joined the group on bass and drums, respectively. Becker remained as drummer long enough to record several tracks on the album.

As credited in the CD booklet, the members were:
Kenny Kessel - bass guitar and backing vocals
Scott Miller - most guitars and vocals
Dawn Richardson - most drums and all vibra-slap
Paul Wieneke - synthesizer, unearthly rackets (beginning of "Sodium", "Chokehold", etc.), guitar, backing vocals, lead vocals on "Uncle Lucky"

Guest musicians included Ken Stringfellow of The Posies on guitar, and Nina Gordon of Veruca Salt. Gordon provided backing vocals on the co-written song "The Softest Tip Of Her Baby Tongue". Stringfellow is credited for co-writing "Sodium Laureth Sulfate" and "I No Longer Fear the Headless," and also played on "Not Expecting Both Contempo And Classique."

Former Game Theory drummer Gil Ray and keyboard player Shelley LaFreniere also appeared as guests; Ray would join the Loud Family as a member for their next album, Days for Days.
Richardson left the band in 1996, and was replaced on the concert tour by drummer Mike Tittel, who currently leads the Ohio-based band New Sincerity Works.

Thematic notes
According to the Los Angeles Times, the "prevailing mood of frustration and loss" in Interbabe Concern sprang from the "collapse of Miller's marriage to Shalini Chatterjee." Critic William Ham, writing in the 2005 book Lost in the Grooves, called this a "harsh, difficult album" with "dizzying mood-swings," drawn from a dark period in Miller's life. Ham noted the twin departures of Miller's wife and his longtime producer Mitch Easter, and inferred that "since Chatterjee is [in 2005] married to Easter, we can assume that the two events were not mutually exclusive."

The result, according to Ham, was a "jagged sonic mosaic" adeptly fashioned by Miller from the "shattered pieces." The Tulsa World'''s Thomas Conner identified it as "sort of a concept album... an overanalysis of a divorce ('recorded in cold, passionless digital') by one very intriguing artist."

Critical response
Mark Deming, in the 2002 book All Music Guide to Rock: The Definitive Guide to Rock, Pop, and Soul, wrote that Interbabe Concern features "the fragmented songs and purposefully twisted aural montage" that were missing from the group's prior album, The Tape of Only Linda. Deming noted:This new Loud Family sounded more like Scott Miller's backing band than the group that made the first two albums, and without producer Mitch Easter on hand, Miller seems to have used Interbabe Concern as an opportunity to reacquaint himself with the cryptic side of his musical personality; there are a lot more short pseudo-tunes interspersed between the "real" songs, plenty of odd found noises and sound effects, and while Miller plays plenty of guitar here, there's a decidedly lower hard-and-heavy quotient than on the muscular The Tape of Only Linda. Interbabe Concern plays like a somewhat stranger version of Loud Family's debut, Plants and Birds and Rocks and Things ... the production has a lot less gloss, and Miller's fondness for chaos seems to outweigh his knack for perfect pop hooks.

According to Conner, "Miller arranges his songs like roller coasters; you always know where you're going to end up, but the time signatures and key changes throw you around on the way there." Conner cited the song "Don't Respond, She Can Tell" as a "real kick with what sounds like a BB dropping on a table keeping time."

 
Reviewers found the album difficult; for example, Deming wrote, "It's an inarguably interesting album, but one that demands a lot more work for the listener to ferret out the good stuff." Conner agreed, and emphasized the reward: "Miller cycles through incongruous guitar chords with the same bravery and success of Steely Dan, and he packs each song with one syllable for nearly every note. Some of these songs might play well with the top down, but those who like to listen too closely to their pop music will get more out of the Loud Family. And you'll have to – it's not an easy album to make sense of on the first spin, but those brave enough to have another go likely will, like me, one day be astonished at how long the disc has been in one chamber of the disc changer."CMJ New Music Monthly''′s review categorized the music as "pop of the most depraved variety," and wrote, "There’s always some jarring detail added or subtracted, some unsettling minor component that takes these tunes out of the realm of the normal. Gently plucked acoustic guitars will suddenly be ripped apart by a mutinous fuzzbox, seemingly at random." The review continued, "If pop’s purpose is to soothe and delight, then this is either half-pop or fullblooded mutation/mutilation, as there’s nothing soothing about this in the least. It’s disturbing, but the sort of disturbance you’ll be whistling at work.

Track listing
"Sodium Laureth Sulfate" – 3:19
"North San Bruno Dishonor Trip" – 0:45
"Don't Respond, She Can Tell" – 3:59
"I'm Not Really a Spring" – 3:41
"Rise of the Chokehold Princess" – 4:20
"Such Little Nonbelievers" – 3:37
"The Softest Tip of Her Baby Tongue" – 3:30
"Screwed Over by Stylish Introverts" – 2:41
"Top-Dollar Survivalist Hardware" – 3:29
"Not Expecting Both Contempo and Classique" – 	3:31
"I No Longer Fear The Headless" – 4:52
"Hot Rox Avec Lying Sweet-Talk" – 1:07
"Uncle Lucky" – 3:53
"Just Gone" – 2:47
"Asleep and Awake on the Man's Freeway" – 2:39
"Where They Go Back to School but Get Depressed" – 2:48
"Where They Sell Antique Food" – 0:38
"Where the Flood Waters Soak Their Belongings" – 1:08
"Where They Walk Over Sainte Therese" – 4:40

References

1996 albums
The Loud Family albums